Orsolya Karalyos (born 18 May 1991 in Debrecen) is a former Hungarian handballer.

Achievements
Nemzeti Bajnokság I:
Silver Medallist: 2010, 2011
Magyar Kupa:
Silver Medallist: 2011

References

External links
 Orsolya Karalyos player profile on Debreceni VSC Official Website
 Orsolya Karalyos career statistics at Worldhandball

1991 births
Living people
Sportspeople from Debrecen
Hungarian female handball players